Augustus George "Gus" Ganakas (July 3, 1926 – January 11, 2019) was an American sports broadcaster, athletics administrator, and coach of the  Michigan State Spartans men's basketball team.

Early life
Ganakas was born on July 3, 1926, in Mount Morris, New York, to Greek immigrant parents.  He served in World War II in the United States Marine Corps, including service at the Battle of Okinawa, and attended Michigan State University on a G.I. Bill scholarship.

Career
Ganakas taught and coached basketball at East Lansing High School, where he won the 1958  State of Michigan High School Championship, posting an undefeated season. In 1964 he became the Coordinator of the Ralph Young Fund, MSU's athletic fund-raising organization. A passion for sports led him back to the world of basketball when Coach John Benington hired him as his  MSU assistant basketball coach in 1966.  Three years later, with the sudden death of Coach Benington, Ganakas became the head basketball coach for the Spartans, from 1969 to 1976, compiling an 89–84 (.514) record over 7 seasons. 

Controversially, a number of black players walked out on coach Ganakas before a key Big Ten game on January 4, 1975, against Indiana.  Ganakas elected to start Jeff Tropf, who was white, 10 black players, led by captain Lindsay Hairston, walked out of the team meeting, returned for the game but were then suspended by Ganakas.  Michigan State lost the game 107-55 with a patchwork roster that included junior varsity players.  Tropf led the team with 21 points. The players would meet with Ganakas the next day, were reinstated after apologizing, and then defeated Ohio State 88-84 the next day.  Tropf would transfer to Central Michigan at the end of the season.

Ganakas was dismissed after the conclusion of the next season on March 16, 1976, but stayed with Michigan State as an Assistant Athletic Director through 1998 and then as an advisor to Spartan Head Coach Tom Izzo through 2000. Ganakas also spent his post-coaching years as a radio analyst on the Spartan Sports Network. He was an active member of the Detroit Sports Broadcasters Association.

About Ganakas, Izzo said, “You’ll learn all you need to about Gus when you look at the way he handled being replaced as head coach.  Most of us would have wanted our replacement to fail, hoping it would make us look good. But that wasn’t who Gus was. Instead, he made sure that the local high school superstar Earvin Johnson knew that Michigan State was still the right place for him to attend and that new coach Jud Heathcote was the right guy to play for. As they say, the rest is history. But there is no doubt that Spartan Basketball wouldn’t be what it is today without Gus Ganakas.”

In 2002, Ganakas became the sixth recipient of the Men's Basketball Distinguished Alumnus Award.  The Michigan State team MVP award is named in his honor.

Personal life and death
Ganakas was married to his wife Ruth who died in 2014, and was survived by his children Gail, Gary, Greg, Anne, Amy and Marcy. He died on January 11, 2019.

Head coaching record

College

References

1926 births
2019 deaths
American men's basketball coaches
American men's basketball players
Basketball coaches from New York (state)
Basketball players from New York (state)
College basketball announcers in the United States
College men's basketball head coaches in the United States
High school basketball coaches in the United States
Michigan State Spartans men's basketball coaches
Michigan State Spartans men's basketball players
Military personnel from New York (state)
People from Mount Morris, New York
American people of Greek descent